The 2019 Victoria Tri-Series was a Women's Twenty20 International (WT20I) cricket tournament held in Uganda.

The series took place from 6 to 10 April 2019, with all matches played at the Lugogo Cricket Oval in Kampala. The participating teams were the women's national sides of Uganda, Kenya and Zimbabwe. These were the first matches played by Kenya Women to have WT20I status after the International Cricket Council announced that all matches played between women's teams of Associate Members after 1 July 2018 would have full T20I status. The tournament provided all three teams with some preparation for the 2019 ICC Women's Qualifier Africa. Zimbabwe defeated Uganda in the final by 25 runs.

Points table

Matches

Final

References

External links
 Series home at ESPN Cricinfo

Women's cricket in Uganda
International cricket competitions in 2018–19
2019 in Ugandan cricket